Ronald Duncan (born 1983) is a Scottish international lawn bowler.

Bowls career
He won the National Pairs Championship in 2014 at the National Championships partnering Colin Walker. During the 2016 World Indoor Bowls Championship pairs they were beaten finalists, losing out to fellow Scots Stewart Anderson and Darren Burnett.

Duncan won a bronze medal in the fours at the 2016 World Outdoor Bowls Championship in Christchurch with Alex Marshall, Paul Foster and Iain McLean.

In 2018 he was selected as part of the Scottish team for the 2018 Commonwealth Games on the Gold Coast in Queensland where he claimed two gold medals in the Triples with Darren Burnett and Derek Oliver and the Fours with Marshall, Oliver and Foster.

Once again partnering Colin Walker the pair reached the semi finals during the 2019 World Indoor Bowls Championship. Also during 2019 he won the fours gold medal and triples silver medal at the Atlantic Bowls Championships

In 2020 he was selected for the 2020 World Outdoor Bowls Championship in Australia.

References

Scottish male bowls players
1983 births
Living people
Commonwealth Games gold medallists for Scotland
Commonwealth Games medallists in lawn bowls
Bowls players at the 2018 Commonwealth Games
Medallists at the 2018 Commonwealth Games